The Navy-Marine Corps Relief Society (NMCRS) is an American non-profit organization that was founded in 1904. The society was created "to provide, in partnership with the Navy and Marine Corps, financial, educational, and other assistance to members of the Naval Services of the United States, eligible family members, and survivors when in need; and to receive and manage funds to administer these programs."

NMCRS makes interest-free loans to cover basic living expenses including utilities, housing and food. It also distributes funds for funeral costs, car repairs, insurance, medical bills, and other expenses. In 2020, the society helped more than 28,000 retired and active duty Marines and their families.

In 2020, NMCRS launched an interest-free program to cover the cost of moving pets during a permanent change of station or move.

Fundraising 
Every year during the month of March, the Department of the Navy hosts its annual Active Duty Fund Drive in support of the NMCRS.

References

External links
www.nmcrs.org—Official web site

Non-profit organizations based in Arlington, Virginia
United States Navy support organizations
Organizations established in 1904
Organizations associated with the United States Marine Corps